This is a list of Chinese Canadians including both original immigrants who obtained Canadian citizenship and their Canadian-born descendants who are notable, have made significant contributions to the Canadian or international culture or society politically, artistically or scientifically, or have prominently appeared in the news.

Politics and public service 
 Arnold Chan (陳家諾), late MP for Scarborough—Agincourt, Liberal
 Michael Chan (陳國治), current Markham Regional Councillor and former Ontario Cabinet Minister, MPP for Markham—Unionville, Liberal
 Raymond Chan (陳卓愉), former federal Minister of State, former MP for Richmond, Liberal
 Tung Chan (陳志動), former Vancouver City Councilor (1990 - 1993)
 Katrina Chen (陳葦蓁), MLA for Burnaby-Lougheed, BC NDP
 Shaun Chen (陳聖源), former Chairman of the Toronto District School Board, Canada's largest school board, elected to the House of Commons of Canada in 2015 representing Scarborough North
 Kenny Chiu (趙錦榮), former MP for Steveston-Richmond East, Conservative
 Gordon Chong (張金儀), late former city councilor and former vice-chairman of the Toronto Transit Commission
 Ida Chong (張杏芳), BC Cabinet Minister, former MLA for Oak Bay-Gordon Head, BC Liberal
 Michael Chong (莊文浩), former federal Cabinet Minister, MP for Wellington—Halton Hills, Conservative
 George Chow (周烱華), two-term Vancouver City Councillor who was elected as a member of the Vision Vancouver party in 2005 and 2008  
 Olivia Chow (鄒至蕙), former MP for Trinity—Spadina from 2006 to 2014, New Democrat. Professor at Ryerson University
 Adrienne Clarkson (伍冰枝), Governor General of Canada from 1999 to 2005, former journalist, novelist, publisher, winner of the Gemini Award: Best Host in a Light Information Programme
 Han Dong (董晗鵬), MP for Don Valley North, Liberal
 Lillian Dyck, Canadian senator
 Ying Hope (劉光英), late former Metro Toronto Councillor
 Ted Hsu (徐正陶), MP and current MPP for Kingston and the Islands, Liberal
 Tammy Hwang, Hamilton City Councillor, Ward 4
 Kerry Jang (鄭文宇), politician, currently serving on Vancouver, British Columbia's City Council
 Douglas Jung (鄭天華), first Canadian of Chinese origin elected to Parliament, former MP for Vancouver Centre, Conservative
 Vincent Ke (柯文彬), Ontario MPP for Don Valley North, Progressive Conservative (PC)
 Jenny Kwan (關慧貞), BC Cabinet Minister, MLA for Vancouver-Mount Pleasant and MP for Vancouver East, New Democrat
 Norman Kwong (林佐民), former Lieutenant Governor of Alberta, star football player in CFL
 Cynthia Lai (封賴桂霞), Toronto city councillor for the Scarborough North electoral district
 David Lam (林思齊), former BC Lieutenant Governor (1988–1995)
 Art Lee, former MP for Vancouver East and Parliamentary Secretary, former leader of British Columbia Liberal Party, Liberal
 Philip S. Lee (李紹麟) Lieutenant Governor of Manitoba (2009–2015)
 Richard Lee (李燦明), former British Columbia Liberal Party MLA for Burnaby North, BC Liberal
 Chungsen Leung (梁中心), former MP for Willowdale and Parliamentary Secretary for Multiculturalism, Conservative
 Sophia Leung (梁陳明任), former MP for Vancouver—Kingsway and Parliamentary Secretary, Liberal
 Laurin Liu (劉舒雲), former MP for Rivière-des-Mille-Îles, New Democrat
 Raymond Louie (雷建华), Vancouver city councillor, former school trustee
 Alan Lowe (劉志強), former Mayor of Victoria, BC
 Jason Luan (栾晋生), former AB MLA for Calgary-Hawkwood, Progressive Conservative (PC)
 Jean Lumb (林黃彩珍), community activist and first Chinese-Canadian to receive the Order of Canada
 Gary Mar (馬健威), former Albertan Cabinet Minister and MLA for Calgary-Mackay, Conservative
 Inky Mark (麥鼎鴻), MP for Dauphin—Swan River, Conservative
 Denzil Minnan-Wong (黃旻南), first Chinese Deputy Mayor, Toronto
 Mary Ng (伍鳳儀), federal Minister of Small Business and Export Promotion and MP for Markham—Thornhill, Liberal
 Victor Oh (胡子修), Canadian senator from Ontario born in Singapore but of Chinese descent, Conservative 
 Billy Pang (彭錦威), Ontario MPP for Markham—Unionville, Progressive Conservative (PC)
 Vivienne Poy (利德蕙), first senator of Chinese ancestry, sister-in-law to Adrienne Clarkson, Liberal
 Daniel Quan-Watson, Deputy Minister for Crown-Indigenous Relations and Northern Affairs Canada. Previously CEO of Parks Canada; Chief Human Resources Officer for Government of Canada; Deputy Minister for Western Economic Diversification
 Ken Sim (沈觀健), mayor-elect of Vancouver
 Mary-Woo Sims (沈明麗), politician and social justice activist; best known as a former chief commissioner of the British Columbia Human Rights Commission
 Mark Sutcliffe, mayor-elect of Ottawa
 Geng Tan (譚耕), former MP for Don Valley North, Liberal
 Sid Chow Tan (周明輝), candidate for Vancouver city council during the 2014 municipal election. President of the Association of Chinese Canadians for Equality and Solidarity Society (ACCESS) and Head Tax Families Society. Chinese Head Tax Redress campaign, fought for over 30 years on the fair and just redress of the Chinese Head Tax. TV program producer. Community activist in the Vancouver Downtown Eastside.
 Tony Tang, engineer and former Vancouver city Councilor
 Daisy Wai, Ontario MPP for Richmond Hill
 Peter Wing (吳榮添), first mayor of Chinese descent in North America, three successive terms as mayor of Kamloops starting in 1966
 Alice Wong (黃陳小萍), MP for Richmond Centre and former Minister of State for Seniors, Conservative
 Bob Wong (黃景培), former Ontario Cabinet Minister and MPP for Fort York, Liberal
 Patrick Wong (黃耀華), former BC MLA for Vancouver-Kensington, BC Liberal
 Peter Wong, former mayor of Sudbury, Ontario
 Soo Wong (黃素梅), Ontario MPP for Scarborough—Agincourt, Liberal
 Tony C. Wong (黃志華), former Ontario MPP for Markham, former York Region Councilor, Liberal
 Kristyn Wong-Tam (黃慧文), LGBTQ activist and Toronto councilor for the Rosedale electoral district
 Teresa Woo-Paw (鮑胡嫈儀), former Albertan MLA for Calgary-Mackay, Conservative
 David Xiao (蕭輝), Albertan MLA for Edmonton-McClung, Conservative
 John Yap (葉志明), BC MLA for Richmond-Steveston, BC Liberal
 Jean Yip (葉嘉麗), MP for Scarborough—Agincourt, Liberal
 Wai Young (楊蕭慧儀), former MP for Vancouver South, Conservative

Law and judiciary 
 Jim Chu (朱小荪), first Chinese Chief Constable of the Vancouver Police Service
 Susan Eng (伍素屏), former chair of the Metro Toronto Police Services Board
 Avvy Go (吳瑤瑤), prominent social justice lawyer and member of the Order of Ontario
 Guo Guoting (郭国汀), prominent lawyer who defended dissidents and Falun Gong practitioners
 Linda Ann Loo, Judge of the Supreme  Court of British Columbia
 Won Alexander Cumyow (溫金有), first person of Chinese origin born in Canada; as a court interpreter, was also the first ethnic-Chinese government official in Canada
 Kew Dock Yip (葉求鐸), first Chinese-Canadian lawyer

Business 
 Caleb Chan, businessman; son of the late Chan Sun; donated $10 million to fund UBC's Chan Centre for the Performing Arts
 Tom Chan, Vancouver based real estate entrepreneur; brother of Caleb Chan and son of the late Chan Shun; donated $10 million to fund UBC's Chan Centre for the Performing Arts
 G. Raymond Chang, co-founder and former CEO of CI Financial, philanthropist and third Chancellor of Ryerson University, whose G. Raymond Chang School of Continuing Education is named after him
 Ben Chiu (邱澤堃), founder of KillerApp.com
 Danielle Fong, co-founder and Chief Scientist of LightSail Energy, Inc.
 Thomas Fung, Hong Kong-born Canadian businessman and philanthropist; eldest son of Fung King Hey; founder of the Fairchild Group
 Fung King Hey, one of the founders of Sun Hung Kai & Co; father of Thomas Fung
 David Ho, Vancouver-based entrepreneur originally from Hong Kong; founder of Harmony Airways; owner of the University Golf Club and MCL motors
 Gary Ho, businessman and ardent philanthropist
 Kwok Yuen Ho (何国源), co-founder and former CEO  of ATI Technologies
 Andrea Jung (鍾彬嫻), CEO of Avon Products
 Li Ka-shing, Chairman of Hutchison Whampoa Limited and Cheung Kong Holdings; investor in Husky Oil
 Eva Kwok, businesswoman and former director of the Bank of Montreal
 Chu Lai, businessman, one of the earliest Chinese-Canadian merchants in British Columbia
 Cindy Lee, businesswoman; founder and current President and CEO of T & T Supermarket
 Paul Lee, former President of Electronic Arts
 Robert H. Lee, Vancouver based businessman; Chairman and founder of Prospero; Robert H. Lee Graduate School is named in honor of his philanthropy
Tina Lee, (李佩婷), CEO of T & T Supermarket
 Michael Lee-Chin, investor; CEO of AIC Canada
 Richard Li, businessman; son of Hong Kong business mogul Li Ka-shing; Chairman of PCCW and chairman of PCCW's executive committee
 Victor Li, businessman; son of Hong Kong business mogul, Li Ka-shing and major investor in Air Canada
 Brandt C. Louie, President and CEO of H.Y. Louie Co. Limited; Chairman of London Drugs Limited
 Yip Sang, businessman
 Alfred Sung, fashion designer and founder of Club Monaco
 Brian Wong, co-founder of Kiip
 Milton Wong, financier and former Chairman of HSBC Canada
 Gabriel Yiu, businessman, journalist, and social activist

Athletics 
 Avianna Chao (趙航), sport shooter in the Olympic Games
 Chris Beckford-Tseu, ice hockey goaltender for the St. Louis Blues
 Chun Hon Chan, Olympic weight lifter
 Patrick Chan (陳偉群), figure skater; 2011 World Champion, four-time Canadian Champion and Olympic medalist
 Bryan Chiu, Chinese-Canadian football player for the Montreal Alouettes
 Adderly Fong (方駿宇), race car driver
 Lori Fung (馮黎明), gymnast and winner of the first gold medal ever in Rhythmic Gymnastics at 1984 Olympic Games
 Chan Hon Goh (吳振紅), first Chinese-Canadian principal dancer with the National Ballet of Canada
 Andre Ho, table tennis player
 Joshua Ho-Sang, ice hockey player
 Jason Ho-Shue, badminton player and national champion in Men's singles
 Carol Huynh (黃嘉露), Olympic gold medalist in wrestling in the 2008 Summer Games in Beijing
 Samantha Jo (aka Sam Tjhia), martial arts, Olympian, actress
 Larry Kwong, (吳啟光), first non-white and first Chinese-Canadian to play in the National Hockey League. Broke hockey's colour barrier
 Norman Kwong (林佐民), known as "The China Clipper", fullback, won four Grey Cups and 30 individual Canadian Football League records; also served as former Lieutenant Governor of Alberta
 Mira Leung (梁美諾), figure skater
 Michelle Li (李文珊), badminton player and 2014 Commonwealth Games Champion
 Landon Ling (林家亮), soccer player
 Alexa Loo (盧仙泳), Olympic snowboarder
 Jujie Luan (栾菊杰), fencer
 Maggie Mac Neil, Olympic gold medal swimmer, 2021 Olympics in Tokyo
 Darryl O'Young (歐陽若曦), racing driver
 Jayde Riviere, Soccer player, 2020 Olympic gold medal with Canada national team. 
 Wendy Saschenbrecker, fencer
 Emilio Estevez Tsai (蔡立靖), soccer player
 Eugene Wang (王臻), Olympic table tennis
 Megan Wing, figure skate
 Charlene Wong, former Olympic figure skater
 Lester Wong, Olympic fencer
 Brandon Yip (葉勁光), ice hockey player for the Phoenix Coyotes
 Zhang Mo (張墨), Olympic table tennis
 Carol Zhao (赵一羽), tennis player

Visual arts
 Raymond Chow, martial arts film producer
 Richard Fung, video artist, writer, public intellectual and theorist
 Terence Koh, diverse work sometimes involving queer, punk, and pornographic sensibilities
 Ken Lum, public art champion, award-winning educator
 Bruce Mau, design, architecture, art, museums, film, eco-environmental design, and conceptual philosophy 
 Paul Wong, award-winning artist, curator, and organizer of public interventions 
 Tobi Wong, artist
 Xiaojing Yan (闫晓静), sculptor, installation artist
Matthew Wong, painter
 Yi Wang,( 王一），Chinese opera singer,

Entertainment 
 Allison Au, Chinese-Jewish Canadian jazz saxophonist
 Aarif Rahman(李治廷), Hong Kong born Chinese Canadian singer/actor
 Aimee Chan(陳茵媺), Canadian actress based in Hong Kong
 Albert M. Chan, actor and filmmaker
 Yung Chang, film director
 Peter Chao, Youtube personality
 Dan Chen,  music producer, instrumentalist
 Joyce Cheng(鄭欣宜), Hong Kong based Canadian singer/actress
 Ken Chinn, punk rock
 Ping Chong (張家平), contemporary theater director
 Mark Chao(趙又廷), Taiwanese-Canadian actor, model
 Caleb Chan, Canadian composer
 Shannon Chan-Kent, Canadian voice actress, singer and actress
 Angela Chang(張韶涵), Taiwanese singer and actress
 Brandon Chang, Taiwanese actor and entertainer
 Desiree Lim, filmmaker
 Osric Chau, Canadian actor
 Edison Chen(陳冠希), Hong Kong Canadian film actor, musician, producer, entrepreneur, and fashion designer
 Terry Chen, Canadian film and television actor
 Fred Cheng(鄭俊弘), Canadian-born Hong Kong actor and singer
 Olivia Cheng, Canadian actress, broadcast journalist, and former correspondent for Entertainment Tonight Canada
 Kayi Cheung, Miss Hong Kong 2007
 Leslie Cheung(張國榮), Hong Kong singer, actor and film producer, Cantopop pioneer
 Charlene Choi(蔡卓妍), Hong Kong actress and singer, Cantopop group Twins
 Rae Dawn Chong, Canadian-American actress
 Robbi Chong, Canadian actress and former model
 Tommy Chong, Canadian-American comedian, actor, writer, director, activist, and musician, part of comedy duo Cheech & Chong
 Lawrence Chou(周俊偉), Hong Kong-based Canadian singer and actor
 Jacky Chu, Taiwanese actor; former member of Taiwanese group 183 Club
 Christy Chung(鍾麗緹), Canadian actress and restaurateur
 Linda Chung(鍾嘉欣), Chinese-Canadian actress and singer
 Shawn Dou(窦骁), Chinese-Canadian actor
 Liu Fang, musician, plays pipa (Chinese lute)
 Evan Fong, Canadian video game commentator
 Patrick Gallagher, Canadian actor
 Godfrey Gao(高以翔), Taiwanese-Canadian actor, brand model
 Chan-hon Goh, ballet dancer, past principal dancer with the National Ballet of Canada
 Anna Guo, musician, plays yangqin (Chinese hammered dulcimer)
 Han Mei, musician and scholar of ethnomusicology, plays guzheng (Chinese plucked zither) and liuqin (Chinese lute)
 He Qiuxia, musician, plays pipa (Chinese lute)
 Anne Heung(向海嵐), Hong Kong Canadian actress and model
 Denise Ho(何韻詩), Hong Kong-based Cantopop singer and social activist
 Sandrine Holt, English-Canadian model and actress
 Samantha Jo, Canadian actress
 Matthew Ko(高鈞賢), Hong Kong actor, 2005 Mr. Hong Kong
 Kristin Kreuk, Canadian actress
 Grace Lynn Kung, Canadian actress
 Jade Kwan(關心妍), Hong Kong Cantopop singer
 Julia Kwan, Vancouver-based filmmaker, resident at Canadian Film Centre
 Kelvin Kwan(關楚耀), Cantopop singer
 Miranda Kwok, screenwriter, actress, and film producer
 Sonija Kwok(郭羨妮), Hong Kong actress, currently works for TVB, 1999 Miss Hong Kong
 Patrick Kwok-Choon, Canadian actor
 Karena Lam(林嘉欣), Taiwanese actress and singer based in Hong Kong
 Henry Lau, singer-songwriter, producer, and actor working in Korean pop music; member of Super Junior-M
 Byron Lawson, Canadian actor
 Cory Lee, Canadian singer-songwriter and actress
 Lee Kum-Sing, pianist
 Quentin Lee (李孟熙) – Canadian / American director, known for gay Asian stories
 Sook-Yin Lee, Canadian broadcaster, musician, filmmaker, and actress; host of CBC Radio's Definitely Not the Opera
 Selena Li(李施嬅), Hong Kong-based Canadian actress 
 Shin Lim (林良尋), America's Got Talent (season 13) winner 2018 (America).
 Anastasia Lin (林耶凡), actress, Miss World Canada 2015, human rights activist, denied opportunity to enter Miss World due to activism
 Bernice Liu(廖碧兒), Canadian actress, singer, and commercial model based in Hong Kong
 Simu Liu, Canadian actor, writer and stuntman
 Hollie Lo, Canadian actress
 Ellen Joyce Loo (盧凱彤), singer, Cantopop group at17
 Alexina Louie, Canadian composer
 Crystal Lowe, Canadian actress and model, best known for her scream queen roles
 Yvette Lu, Canadian independent film and stage actress, filmmaker, singer, composer, writer and producer
 Linlyn Lue, Canadian actress
 David Y.H. Lui, Vancouver arts impresario and producer
 Nicole Lyn, actress known for her role in TV series Student Bodies
 Kenneth Ma(馬國明), Canadian actor working in Hong Kong
 Lena Ma (馬艶冰), beauty pageant queen
 Melissa O'Neil, Canadian singer and musical theatre actress
 Daniel Ong, actor and radio-TV personality in Singapore 
 Eddie Peng(彭于晏), also known as Peng Yu-yen), a Taiwanese Canadian actor
 Keanu Reeves, Canadian movie actor
 Steph Song, actress
 Domee Shi, animator/writer/director, Academy Award winner
 Lydia Shum(沈殿霞), Hong Kong and Canadian comedian and actor
 Mina Shum, Canadian independent film director
 Hayden Szeto, Canadian actor
 Meg Tilly, actress and novelist
 Angela Tong(湯盈盈), Hong Kong based Canadian actress
 Nicholas Tse(謝霆鋒), Hong Kong based Canadian actor, martial artist, TV chef, entertainer
 Yee Jee Tso, Canadian actor
 Cissy Wang(汪詩詩), fashion model, wife of Donnie Yen
Jeremy Wang, better known as Disguised Toast, YouTube personality
 Byron Wong, music and TV producer; founder of several entertainment and new media production and design companies
  Debbie Wong, actress and model
 Ellen Wong, Canadian actress of Cambodian and Chinese descent
 Jadyn Wong, Canadian actress
 Kris Wu (吴亦凡), also known as Wu Yifan, Canadian-Chinese actor and singer-songwriter, former member of band EXO
 Stephen Yan, celebrity chef
 Benny Yau, Canadian television presenter, actor, and singer
 Sally Yeh(葉蒨文), Taiwanese-Canadian Cantopop singer and actress
 Françoise Yip(葉芳華), Canadian actress
 Raugi Yu, actor
 Catalina Yue,  singer, songwriter, actress
 Tony Yu (余景天), Chinese-Canadian singer, dancer, former Youth With You (season 3) and Produce X 101 contestant
 Rui Shi Zhuo (卓汭仕), Canadian composer  
 Song Yiren (宋伊人), Chinese-Canadian actress.

Media 
 Andrew Chang, journalist and news anchor for CBC Television
 Wei Chen, journalist for Canadian radio and TV
 Cindy Cheung, TV presenter, most recently with Fairchild Television
 Sharlene Chiu, television reporter, host, and producer most known for MTV News Canada
 Mellissa Fung, journalist for CBC news
 Jiang Weiping, journalist, emigrated to Canada after release from prison in China
 Bernard Lo, news anchor and show host for financial TV shows, based in Hong Kong
 Elaine Lui, television reporter, entertainer, "gossip maven" for CTV Television Network
 Sheng Xue (also known as Reimonna Sheng), Canadian Chinese journalist, writer, activist for civil rights in China
 Ziya Tong, Canadian television personality and producer, news and science shows
 
 Jan Wong (黃明珍), journalist for several Canadian newspapers, known for Lunch With... column

Literature
 Chan Koonchung (陈冠中), science fiction novelist
 Cheng Sait Chia, poet
 Denise Chong (鄭霭玲), author of books on history, former economic adviser to the government, author of widely anthologized speech "Being Canadian"
 Kevin Chong, novelist, author of non-fiction, and freelance journalist
 Wayson Choy (崔維新), novelist and memoirist, teaches writing at Humber College
 Jim Wong-Chu, poet, author, historian, activist 
 Judy Fong Bates, fiction writer
 Evelyn Lau (劉綺芬), poet, novelist, essayist, novelist
 Vincent Lam, non-fiction and fiction writer and practicing physician, winner of 2006 Scotiabank Giller Prize
 Larissa Lai, poet and novelist
 Sky Lee, feminist, lesbian writer of fiction and non-fiction
 Margaret Lim, author of children's books set in Malaysia
 Andy Quan, gay Canadian novelist who explores interaction sexual and cultural identity, now living in Australia
 Goh Poh Seng, Singaporean and Canadian novelist, poet, playwright
 Fred Wah,  novelist, critic, writer, and former Canadian Parliamentary Poet Laureate
 Rita Wong, poet
 Paul Yee, historian, prolific writer of both children's and adult books about the Chinese Canadian experience
 Chia-ying Yeh, poet and scholar, UBC professor and Fellow of the Royal Society of Canada
 Ying Chen (应晨), novelist
 Xiran Jay Zhao, author of young adult and middle grade speculative fiction, Internet personality

Science and technology 
 Thomas Chang, physician, medical scientist, and inventor credited with co-inventing the world's first artificial cell 
 James K. M. Cheng, architect
 Kin-Yip Chun, geophysicist
 Anming Hu, mechanical engineer, target of controversial US prosecution
 Roger Hui, computer scientist and co-developer of the J programming language
 Yuet Wai Kan, medical scientist and physician; pioneer of applying molecular biology and genetics into clinical medicine
 Victor Ling, medical researcher whose research focuses on drug resistance in cancer; known for his discovery of P-glycoprotein 
 Tak Wah Mak, medical researcher, geneticist, oncologist, and biochemist; known for his discovery of the T-cell receptor and pioneering work in the genetics of immunology
 Bing Thom, architect
 Paul Tseng, applied mathematician who went missing while kayaking in the Yangtze River in the Yunnan province of China and is presumed dead
 Tsui Lap-chee (徐立之), geneticist 
 Joseph Yu Kai Wong, physician and philanthropist
 William Kwong Yu Yeung, astronomer; discoverer of asteroids and the comet 172P/Yeung

Education and academia 
 
 Jerome Chen, historian of China, author, former professor at York University
 Kevin Chan, physician, Chair of Pediatrics at Memorial University in St. John's Newfoundland
 Konrad Ng, scholar of Asian-American cinema and digital media; director of Smithsonian Asian Pacific American Center; professor at University of Hawaii at Manoa
 Eleanor Ty (鄭綺寧), scholar of Asian North American literature, professor of English at Wilfrid Laurier University.

Other 
 Huseyincan Celil (赛因江·贾里力), Uyghur extradited to China from Uzbekistan
 Simon Chang, fashion designer
 Bill Chong (鄭根), spy for Britain during WW-II, awarded British Empire Medal.
 Eric Chong, professional chef and winner of MasterChef Canada (season 1)
 Sunny Fong, fashion designer
 Dan Liu (廖建明), fashion designer
 Susur Lee, chef and international restaurateur based in Toronto
 Alvin Leung (梁經倫), chef and TV personality
 Vincent Li (李偉光), committed infamous murder
 Moy Lin-shin (梅連羨), Taoist monk and founder of International Taoist Tai Chi Society (國際道家太極拳社)
 Cody Sun (孙立宇), professional League of Legends player
 Christopher Siu, professional chef and winner of MasterChef Canada (season 7)
 Riza Santos, beauty queen
 Sunny Tang, founder of Wushu Canada and Sunny Tang Martial Arts Centre chain of martial arts centres
 Joseph Tsai, businessman
 Tse Chi Lop (謝志樂), alleged kingpin of the Sam Gor crime syndicate 
 Adrian Wu, fashion designer
 Jason Wu, fashion designer
 Joe Zee – creative director of Elle magazine; host of fashion TV series All on the Line

References 

 
Canadian